Sukhov 2-y is a rural locality (a khutor) in Mikhaylovka Urban Okrug, Volgograd Oblast, Russia. The population was 1,379 as of 2010. There are 27 streets.

Geography 
Sukhov 2-y is located 36 km southeast of Mikhaylovka. Sukhov 1-y is the nearest rural locality.

References 

Rural localities in Mikhaylovka urban okrug